The 2015–16 North Texas Mean Green men's basketball team represented the University of North Texas during the 2015–16 NCAA Division I men's basketball season. The Mean Green, led by fourth-year head coach Tony Benford, played their home games at UNT Coliseum, nicknamed The Super Pit, and were members of Conference USA. They finished the season 12–20, 7–11 in C-USA play to finish in a three-way tie for ninth place. They lost in the second round of the C-USA tournament to WKU.

Previous season 
The Mean Green finished the 2014–15 season 14–17, 8–10 in C-USA play in a 4 way tie for seventh place. They lost in the first round of the C-USA tournament to Rice.

Departures

Incoming Transfers

Recruiting class of 2015

Roster

Schedule
 
|-
!colspan=9 style=| Non-conference regular season

|-
!colspan=12 style=| Conference USA regular season

|-
!colspan=9 style=| Conference USA tournament

See also
2015–16 North Texas Mean Green women's basketball team

References

North Texas Mean Green men's basketball seasons
North Texas
North Texas Mean Green men's b
North Texas Mean Green men's b
The bubble bowl